The 2013 AFL Tasmania TSL premiership season is a current Australian Rules Football competition staged across Tasmania, Australian over eighteen roster rounds and six finals series matches between 29 March and 21 September 2013.

The League is known as the RACT Insurance Tasmanian State League under a commercial naming-rights sponsorship agreement with the motoring insurance company.

South Launceston won the premiership after defeating Burnie in the grand final.

Participating Clubs
Burnie Dockers Football Club
Clarence District Football Club
Devonport Football Club
Glenorchy District Football Club
Hobart Football Club
Lauderdale Football Club
Launceston Football Club
North Hobart Football Club
North Launceston Football Club
South Launceston Football Club

2013 TSL Club Coaches
Brent Plant (Burnie)
Matthew Drury (Clarence)
Paul Griffiths (Devonport)
Ben Beams (Glenorchy)
Anthony McConnon (Hobart)
Darren Winter (Lauderdale)
Anthony Taylor (Launceston)
Lance Spaulding (North Hobart)
Zane Littlejohn (North Launceston)
Mitch Thorp (South Launceston)

Current Leading Goalkickers: Tasmanian State League

Medal Winners

TSL Colts Grand Final

2013 Foxtel Cup
(Saturday, 20 April 2013) 
– Southport (NEAFL) 11.11 (77) v Burnie (TSL) 7.7 (49) – Metricon Stadium Gold Coast

2013 Tasmanian State League results

2013 TSL Ladder
Source: TSL season 2013 results

2013 TSL Finals Series
2013 TSL FINALS Series

Note that South Launceston withdrew from the competition at the end of the 2013 season and were replaced by the Western Storm Football Club
Note that North Hobart withdrew from the competition at the end of the 2013 season and were replaced by the Hobart City Football Club
Note that Hobart withdrew from the competition at the end of the 2013 season and were replaced by Kingborough Football Club, which stylises itself as Tigers FC

State game
The TSL representative team competed against the NEAFL's NSW/ACT representative team in 2013.

References

https://web.archive.org/web/20140407083156/http://australianfootball.com/seasons/season/TSL/2013/

2013
2013 in Australian rules football